Okoniewski is a Polish surname. Notable people with the surname include:

 Mariusz Okoniewski (1956–2006), Polish speedway rider
 Rafał Okoniewski (born 1980), Polish speedway rider
 Steve Okoniewski (born 1949), American football player

Polish-language surnames